The 2021–22 Chinese Women's Volleyball Super League is the 25th season of the Chinese Women's Volleyball Super League, the highest professional volleyball league in China. The season began on 25 November 2021 and end the Finals on 6 January 2022. Tianjin Bohai Bank were the defending champion. The league is divided into three stages. The first stage, 14 teams separated into two groups, matches began on 25 November and ended on 4 December. The second stage, began on 15 December and ended on 28 December. The final stage, began on 30 December and ended on 6 January .

Shenzhen Phoenix is the new team in this season, which was established by Chinese Volleyball Association and Volleyball Federation of Serbia in 2021.

Similar to Season 2020/21, this season also held at one designed venue, no spectators is allowed. Meanwhile, All Star Games made its return this season after last year's absence.

Teams

Teams and locations

Foreign players
The number of foreign players is restricted for each club. In this season, each team is only allowed one foreign player in a match, no more than one is allowed at the same time.

Transfer players

Regular season

First stage

Group A

|}

Source: Ranking Table Group A

Round 1 

|}

Round 2

|}

Round 3

|}

Round 4

|}

Round 5

|}

Round 6

|}

Round 7

|}

Group B

|}
Source: Ranking Table Group B

Round 1

|}

Round 2

|}

Round 3

|}

Round 4

|}

Round 5

|}

Round 6

|}

Round 7

|}

Second stage

Final stage

Final standing

References

External links 
 Official website of the Chinese Volleyball Association

Volleyball League, 2019-20
Volleyball League, 2019-20
2021 in women's volleyball